"Einstein's constant" might mean:

Cosmological constant
Einstein gravitational constant in the Einstein field equations
Speed of light in vacuum

cs:Einsteinova konstanta
fi:Einsteinin vakio